Neolitsea daibuensis is a species of plant in the family Lauraceae endemic to Taiwan. It is threatened by habitat loss.

References

daibuensis
Endangered plants
Endemic flora of Taiwan
Trees of Taiwan
Taxonomy articles created by Polbot